Father Vojtech may refer to:

 Father Vojtech (1929 film), a 1929 Czech film directed by Martin Frič
 Father Vojtech (1936 film), a 1936 Czech film also directed by Martin Frič